"Mu isamaa on minu arm" ("My Fatherland is My Love") is an Estonian poem by Lydia Koidula. The poem was first set to music for the first Estonian Song Festival in 1869 by Aleksander Kunileid.

"Mu isamaa on minu arm" became a very popular patriotic song when a new melody was written by Gustav Ernesaks in 1944. Beginning in 1947, it is always the last song performed at the Estonian Song Festival. During the Soviet regime, "Mu isamaa on minu arm" became something of an unofficial national anthem.

English version (non-literal)
My fatherland is my love,
To whom I've given my heart.
To you I sing, my greatest happiness,
My blossoming Estonia!
Your pain boils in my heart,
Your pride and joy makes me happy,
My fatherland, my fatherland!

My fatherland is my love,
I shall never leave him,
Even if I must die a hundred deaths
Because of him!
Though foreign envy slander you,
You still live in my heart,
My fatherland, my fatherland!

My Fatherland is My Love,
And I want to rest,
To lie down into your arms,
My sacred Estonia!
Your birds will sing sleep to me,
Flowers will bloom from my ashes,
My fatherland, my fatherland!

Estonian version

Notes and references

 Paul Rummo, "Ühe laulu lugu" – Looming 1961, nr 1, lk 111–128 ja Paul Rummo raamatus "Mitme laulu lood" (uurimusi, kõnesid mälestusi), ER 1969, lk 25–53

National symbols of Estonia
Estonian songs
Estonian patriotic songs
Estonian poems